Chah Gowd-e Chamardan (also Romanized as Chāh Gowd-e Chamardān; also known as Chāh Gowd) is a village in Kohurestan Rural District, in the Central District of Khamir County, Hormozgan Province, Iran. At the 2006 census, its population was 133, in 28 families.

References 

Populated places in Khamir County